The La Touche's free-tailed bat (Tadarida latouchei) is a species of bat in the family Molossidae. It is found in China, Japan, and Thailand.

References

Tadarida
Taxonomy articles created by Polbot
Taxa named by Oldfield Thomas
Mammals described in 1920
Bats of Asia